Flag football is a variant of American football where, instead of tackling players to the ground, the defensive team must remove a flag or flag belt from the ball carrier ("deflagging") to end a down. The sport has a strong amateur following with several national and international competitions each year sponsored by various associations but is most popularly played in America where it was invented.

In flag football, contact is limited between players. The international governing body for the sport is the International Federation of American Football (IFAF). In 2022, flag football was shortlisted as a proposed discretionary event for the 2028 Summer Olympics in Los Angeles.

History
The creation of the game of Flag Football can be attributed to Porter Wilson, who was the man who invented flag-a-tag belts & flags used as equipment to play the sport.

The best available records to date point to the early 1940s during World War II as the sport's starting point. The game began as a recreational sport created for American military personnel to help them stay fit but was designed in a way that would help prevent them from becoming injured during wartime. At the time it was called "Touch and Tail football", which then became "flag football" after the war ended.

The first known recorded history of flag football can be traced to Fort Meade, Maryland, USA, which is now generally accepted as the sport's birthplace. The first national flag football organization, the National Touch Football League, was formed in the 1960s in St. Louis, Missouri. Since 1971, the league has had a national championship game.

Basic rules
The specific rules of flag football vary widely by league, though all share in common their replication of the rules of traditional US-American football with tackling replaced by flag-pulling.

Traditional American football rules are often eliminated or modified to reflect the more recreational nature of the game, the desire to avoid physical contact and injury, and the generally smaller number of participating players per side.

Variations

Chiefly, because there is no dominant sanctioning organization for the sport, the game has mutated into many variations: 9, 8, 7, 6, 5, and 4 players on each side; coed or single-gender; with kicking and punting and with point-after conversions (including some with 1, 2, and 3 point tries) or without; and field sizes that vary from full Canadian Football League (CFL) size, National Football League (NFL) size (120 yards long by 53 yards wide), to fields a third that size.

An important distinction is whether linemen are allowed to catch passes ("Eligible Linemen") or, as in the NFL / CFL, are not allowed to do so ("Ineligible Linemen").  Flag (and touch) football may also be divided into "contact" or "non-contact", depending on whether or not blocking is allowed; if allowed, blocking is usually restricted to the chest.

The ability or inability for the quarterback to advance the ball past the line of scrimmage (LOS) by running is another rule subject to variation by league.

The sport is also played on surfaces other than a traditional grass football field, including on sand beaches; beach flag football has previously featured as a discipline at the Asian Beach Games.

IFAF Flag Football World Championship

The IFAF Flag Football World Championship is normally conducted every two years. IFAF stands for International Federation of American Football.

IFAF Flag Football World Championship 2021

The International Federation of American Football (IFAF) had selected Israel to host the Flag Football World Championships for 2021 IFAF Flag Football World Championship with World Games places up for grabs. The Kraft Family Sports Campus in Jerusalem, was originally scheduled to stage the men's and women's events, however, due to  expected high winds the games were played at Teddy Stadium.

An IFAF event record of 39 men's and women's teams combined, spanning 22 countries, competed at the tournament in Israel. Normally conducted every two years, Denmark was scheduled to host the 2020 edition only for it to be canceled due to the coronavirus pandemic.

The United States retained their men's and women's titles at the International Federation of American Football (IFAF) World Flag Football Championships in Jerusalem. The US fought back in both finals, against Mexico to successfully defend their world crowns.

Women's gold
Against Mexico in the women's gold-medal match, the Americans scored 12 unanswered points in the second period to seal a 31–21 victory. In the semi-finals the US beat Austria 33–6, and Mexico beat Brazil 47–6 to reach the final.

Men's gold
The US Men's team too rallied from behind against Mexico to a 44–41 victory and retain their world title. A 35–6 win over Panama sent the US through to the final, and Mexico beat Italy 36–35 to join them in the tournament's showpiece contest.

Other nations

 Austria defeated Brazil 26–13 to win the women's bronze medal.

 Panama edged out Italy 45–40 in the men's third-place playoff.

Medal table

Olympics 
In July 2022, the National Football League (NFL) and the IFAF partnered on a bid for flag football to be included as an optional event during the 2028 Summer Olympics in Los Angeles. Executive VP of football operations Troy Vincent stated that the sport was "the future of American football", as it was inclusive and had fewer barriers to access.  The NFL had sponsored the inclusion of flag football as an invitational event during that month's 2022 World Games—a multi-sport event featuring sports and disciplines not currently contested at the Olympics—in Birmingham, Alabama. The men's tournament was won by the United States, and the women's tournament by Mexico. In August 2022, flag football was shortlisted as one of nine sports advancing to the next phase of the bid process.

World Games

The 2022 World Games marked the 40th anniversary of the event, which took place from July 7–17, 2022. Hosted at Birmingham's historic Legion Field, Flag Football featured eight men's teams and eight women's teams from around the world. In 2021 the World Games uploaded a beginner's guide to World Games Flag Football.
 
As the reigning world champions, the United States men's and women's teams both pre-qualified for the 2022 World Games. The remaining seven teams were selected through the IFAF qualifying process

North America

NFL Pro Bowl Flag 
For the 2023 Pro Bowl, the National Football League showcased its premier Pro Bowl players and the best of NFL Flag teams from around the country with their skills in a week-long celebration, "The Pro Bowl Games," featuring a new format spotlighting Flag Football.

NFL Flag 
The National Football League and its teams have promoted and sponsored flag football leagues in the United States as a youth sport under the branding NFL Flag; in 2020, Seattle Seahawks quarterback Russell Wilson became a chairman and co-owner of NFL Flag, as part of efforts by the NFL to expand its promotion of the sport into other territories. The program has also placed a particular focus on expanding women's flag football, due to gridiron football having predominantly been played by men.

NFL Flag is the largest youth flag football league in the U.S. An NFL licensed property for girls and boys ages 5–17, NFL FLAG has more than 1,600 locally operated leagues and over 500,000 youth athletes across all 50 states. In 2020, Superbowl champion and Denver Broncos quarterback Russell Wilson was named co-owner and chairman of NFL FLAG in an effort to help grow the sport worldwide.

American Flag Football League

On June 28, 2017, the inaugural game for the newly formed American Flag Football League was played. The league plans to launch eight league-owned teams for 2018.

Canadian Flag Football League

The Canadian Flag Football League (CFFL) was established in 2019 and runs Canada's CFFL National Championship. The league is affiliated with Football Canada, the national governing body for football in Canada and its variants. The winners of the CFFL National Championship also gain the opportunity to represent Canada in international competition.

The league's major objective is to help integrate existing adult flag leagues on a nationwide basis. Depending on the region, teams compete in their Regional Championships, either Eastern, Western, or Central. The top two teams from each division will advance to the national championship.

There are three divisions for the CFFL: male, female, and mixed.

Varsity sport

America
In May 2020, the National Association of Intercollegiate Athletics (NAIA), in partnership with the NFL, announced the addition of flag football as a varsity sport for female student-athletes. The NAIA became the first collegiate governing body to sanction the sport at the varsity level.

Women's flag began during the 2020–21 season as an emerging sport with at least 15 teams, and the NAIA and NFL also expected an upgrade of the sport to an invitational level sport by 2022 with at least 25 teams.

International

International Woman's Flag Football Association
The International Woman's Flag Football Association, IWFFA, host 8 on 8 flag football tournaments and flag football training across the world with participants from the United States, Canada, Mexico, Sweden, Norway, Finland, Denmark, Iceland, Scotland and several other nations. The organisation is the largest for women and girls in the sport. The most active tournament is held each February in Key West, Florida, called the Kelly McGillis Classic where over 90 women and girls teams participate in 8 on 8, semi - blocking contact flag football. There are no restrictions for girls and women to play.

International Federation of American Football
The International Federation of American Football (IFAF) organizes the IFAF Flag Football World Championship every two years since 2002.

International Flag Football Festival
The International Flag Football Festival (IFFF) organizes the World Cup of Flag Football featuring teams from the United States, Mexico and several other nations.

United Kingdom
Flag football competition in the United Kingdom is, mostly, 5-a-side, There are two main organisations: The adult only Outlaw Flag League, which run Tournaments in two conferences, the Exile conference and the Bandit conference, from March to October, culminating in playoff and championships. Secondly, the NFFL, The National Flag Football League, organised by The British American Football Association (BAFA). At a senior level, there are sixty teams divided into two leagues. NFFL Division One: Highlands, North A,North B, Midlands, South East, and South West and The Premiership: Highlands, North, South East, and South West, with the top teams qualifying for playoffs at the end of the season. BAFA also run The Youth Flag Football League (YFFL) and  organise teams competing at under 17, under 14, and under 11.  Flag football games in the UK are played with five players on each side with no contact, and are officiated according to the IFAF flag football rules with a few minor variations. The U17s and U14s, and, for the 2023 season U11s, compete in the National Youth Flag Football League, which runs from April to August, with teams playing in Local and regional tournaments to qualify for National Finals Day and ultimately be crowned National Champions.

BAFA National Flag finals

See also

 Touch football (American)
 American football strategy
 Rugby football
 Tag rugby

References

External links 

 United States Flag & Touch Football League

 
Sports originating in the United States
Variations of American football